This is a list of members of the National Assembly in the 24th Parliament of South Africa.

Bold text denotes cabinet ministers
Italic denotes party leaders.

Members

Eastern Cape

Free State

Gauteng

KwaZulu-Natal

Limpopo

Mpumalanga

North West

Northern Cape

Western Cape

24th South African Parliament